BoybandPH (also known as BPH) is a Filipino boy band composed of Neil Murillo, Russell Reyes, Ford Valencia, Tristan Ramirez, and Joao Constancia. The group was formed on December 11, 2016, after winning ABS-CBN's reality show Pinoy Boyband Superstar, a franchise of Simon Cowell's singing competition La Banda.

After winning Pinoy Boyband Superstar, the group released its first single on January 1, 2017, entitled "Unli". It was followed by a second single, a cover of Depeche Mode's "Somebody" on February 14, 2017. The boys released their debut, self-titled album on February 4, 2017, under Star Music. On April 2, 2017, BoybandPH was awarded the Gold Record Award, with the album reaching over 7,500 copies sold in less than two months.

The group is managed by Star Magic with a recording contract with Star Music. It is currently a mainstay act on ASAP, a noontime variety television show in the Philippines. The boys also have an ongoing online show every Sunday where they cover songs requested by the fans.

Members

Joao Constancia

 Rapper, Sub vocals, Main dancer

Niel Murillo
 Lead vocalist (Tenor)
Orlando Sinangote Murillo IV (born January 12, 1999) the fourth child of eight, to parents Orlando Murillo Jr. and Edwina Sinangote-Murillo. A native of Bogo City in Cebu, Niel started singing at a very young age and received praise at school for his singing. His older brother went blind in 2012, which prompted Niel to help his family financially.

He auditioned for the Pinoy Boyband Superstar show. In 2016, at age 17, Murillo quickly became a crowd favorite. He received 96% of the votes from the female audience, advancing him to the next level where he gave his rendition of Sam Concepcion's "Mahal na mahal". The audition song led to recognition from Lea Salonga. He continued to be selected onto its Top 7 grand finalist singing boyband hits such as Backstreetboys' "I Want It that Way", One Direction's "Best Song Ever"  and All-4-One's "I Swear" with other aspirants. 
Murillo gained praises & a standing ovation together with other aspirants after singing All-4-One's "I Swear". He later performed So Sick sung with Ford Valencia. In the 2-day finale, Murillo and his co-aspirant Russell Reyes performed Major Lazer's "Cold Water" where they received positive comments from judges Yeng Constantino and Aga Mulach. He was the first winner to receive the highest combined scores from the judges' ratings and the number of text votes (a total of 98.63%), beating out six other finalists of the talent show. His non-competition piece was "I Won't Give Up" by Jason Mraz.

He and Russell Reyes are the main vocals of the group. In some of their interviews, Niel said that his inspiration for what he's doing is his blind brother.

Tristan Ramirez
 Vocalist (Baritone)

Tristan Dae Santos Ramirez was born on January 19, 1993, in the Philippines, the oldest member of the group. He opted out of college due to financial constraints and pursued modeling and acting instead. Before joining the contest, he used to perform at parties to be able to help support his family. Tristan won the votes of the girls (90%) and when he came to sing for the judges he was very emotional and his mom suddenly came in and also sang for the judges. Tristan sang " Ikaw lang ang aking mahal" by vst & co. Judges said he might be too old for the show but still let Tristan compete. Tristan Ramirez was joined a previous show in other channels," Walang tulugan with the master showman. He also played some roles in other channel tv shows, "More than words, Dormitoryo, aldub special, Instadad." He was a contestant on the show master showman with the co-stars Jake Vargas, Ken Chan, Sanya Lopez, etc. Christian "Tristan" Ramirez said he joined Pinoy Boyband Superstar to support his siblings on studies and to support his parents and make them stop working. He also fixed their house on Bulacan which was seen on the show. Fans adore him because he is a  very positive and witty man. Though he came from the very bottom on the show everyone was proud of him because he made it to the top. So every adored he's hard work to achieve his goals. Tristan may be the oldest but he proves that age does not matter. The judges also adored him because of his performances like when judge vice and aga said " Hindi Kita napapansin noon but now you stood out."

Tristan Ramirez was put on the bottom 20 where he was put on team A along with Lucho, James, Jay, Kim, Sef, Michael, Nico, Ethan, Brandyn, and Miko and they sang " As long as you love me", by Backstreet Boys. And after the performance Tristan was chosen to top 12 and went to the live shows where he performed with Joao and James and performed "Rude" and judges were amazed by him and got saved from elimination rounds. Although Tristan was put in danger when it came to his grand reveal performance and judges commented that his performance wasn't enough. Though Tristan was put into the top 7 as the last grand finalist by the votes of the superfans and judges. On the grand reveal day where winners were chosen, Tristan was chosen as the 4th member that will be part of the group " BoybandPH" Tristan was never expected and he got a standing ovation from judges and fans when Billy called out his name. Everyone was very proud of him because from the bottom 20 and he made it to the top 5. On their final performance, it was seen that new members were very emotional while singing their newest single " We made it". BoybandPH also joined the reality game show "Minute to win it", where Tristan played and was declared as one of the winners he also played along with other winner and also won the game but did not receive the prize. But he was given support by co-members Russell Reyes, Ford Valencia, Niel Murrillo and Joao Constancia

In 2021, Tristan Ramirez is about to tie the knot with his fiancée, Ia Dela Cruz. These couples are open with their relationship since the beginning. Today, they often post their wedding preparation.

Russell Reyes
 Main vocalist (High tenor), Pianist

Russell Antolin Reyes (born in Chicago, Illinois on August 23, 1998) is a singer and plays the piano. He is the second child of Filipino parents Reggie Reyes and Lynda Reyes, who emigrated to Illinois, Chicago from Camiguin and Cagayan de Oro. His passion for music never left him, at age 13, Russell won in the 2012 Niles North HS Variety Show with his friend and at the same high school he was cast in the Disney musical Beauty and the Beast. In 2015 he was invited to perform together with other musicians in Illinois Music Educators Association (ILMEA) District 7 Festivals. He was part of the Vocal Jazz Ensemble. After Graduating from Niles North High School in 2016 he travelled to the Philippines for vacation but then found himself auditioning for the first-ever season of Pinoy Boyband Superstar. Reyes, together with the other 4 talented aspirants, eventually won the said competition and became the most requested boyband in the Philippines. In 2016, Reyes auditioned for Pinoy Boyband Superstar with his own version of Stevie Wonder's "Lately". Despite his good voice and charisma, he had a rough start due to not being fluent in the Filipino language. During the next round of the competition, Reyes sang Bituin Escalante's "Kung Ako Na Lang Sana" which wowed judges Yeng Constantino and Sandara Park.

Dubbed as one of the strongest vocally, his journey on the talent search went easier. Reyes also gained praises & a standing ovation together with other aspirants after singing All-4-One's "I Swear" On the first day of the two-day finale Reyes sang with co-aspirant Niel Murillo Major Lazer's "Cold Water", while on the second day he sang Adele's "All I Ask" proving he got what it takes to be part of the ultimate Pinoy boyband. He became the second member of BoybandPH garnering an impressive 100% from the combined text votes and judges votes.

Ford Valencia
 Vocalist (Countertenor)

Ferdinand Cabriana Valencia was born on July 15, 1995, in Valenzuela City, in Metro Manila, Philippines. His father suffered a stroke when he was young and he became the breadwinner of the family from a very young age. He won the girl's votes on the audition ( 86%) and when he came to the judges, vice said " Mukha Kang matured for this performance dahil sa buhok mo." and he sang " All of Me" by John Legend. Although Vice Ganda said no he still got 3 yes from other judges. And he made it into the competitions. Even Judge Sandara Park said, " Excited na akong ayusan ka".  Before the program, he had worked as a waiter, ship mechanic, insurance agent, and a freelance singer to make both ends meet. He says his inspiration was his father who has a stroke, and he was the reason why he wanted to join and win the competition. Judges says that ford was vocally good but he just needed to be more open with himself. Ford made it to the top 20 where he performed" Nanghihinayang", by Jeremiah. People said his most outstanding performance was "I swear", where he performed with his co-competitors Niel Murrillo and Russell reyes. Ford was emotional when it comes to his family, it was proven when his mom visited him on the show, and where he said:"Di ko pinapakita sa family ko na umiiyak ako." And where his mom said that ford was doing this hard work for his father. And in every interview ford always says that he thinks and uses his father as an inspiration to work harder on the show.

Ford was declared as the 3rd member of the Boyband. In their guesting on" Gandang Gabi Vice (GGV) (Vice Ganda) Vice said " Naiinis ako sayo dahil pag performance nahihiya ka, when I know you could give more." And ford said he wasn't used to exposing himself on TV because he has been on so many rejections. And as they declared his name as one of the winners Ford also started being emotionally thankful. He is a very shy and quiet person but he said when you meet him more he is a very loud and loving person.

At 2021, He recently announced and confirmed on Showtime his relationship with his former fan. "Nag ig live ako tapos nag hi siya, tapos nag hi ako, tapos yun na", Ford stated after being asked by Vice Ganda, "Saan kayo nag kakilala?". He usually posts pictures with his non-showbiz girlfriend, Gabrielle Villamin on Instagram.

History

2016: Pinoy Boyband Superstar and Formation
In 2016 ABS-CBN announced an upcoming reality show that will feature the making of a Pinoy Boyband, based on the television reality singing competition created by Simon Cowell. The show opened auditions in eleven different locations around the Philippines as well as Online and on Social Media. From here hopefuls Ford Valencia, Joao Constancia, Niel Murillo, Russell Reyes and Tristan Ramirez auditioned as solo acts and competed against other contestants coming from different parts of the Philippines as well as overseas. During the Judges Audition they had to charm their way through the audience, and get scored based on their charisma and charm, before they could perform in front of the judges. Ford Valencia garnered a score of 83% and performed John Legend's hit "All of Me". Joao Constancia garnered a score of 94% from the audience and performed Adam Sandler's "Grow Old With You". Niel Murillo garnered a score of 96% and performed "Mahal na Mahal" by Sam Concepcion making him an instant fan favorite. His audition clip on YouTube gained the most views out of all the auditionees. Russell Reyes garnered a score of 80% and performed a soulful rendition of Stevie Wonder's "Lately". Tristan Ramirez got a score of 90% from the audience and performed "Ikaw lang ang Aking Mahal" by Brownman Revival. During the Middle Rounds the 40 contestants that passed the audition were cut down into 25. From there they were segregated into five different groups which were tasked to perform different genres of music. Before the deliberation and announcement of the groups, Russell Reyes along with two other contestants who had a hard time speaking the local language were asked to sing a Tagalog song to prove themselves worthy of a spot. Russell Reyes performed his version of "Kung ako Nalang Sana" wherein the judges were impressed. After the performance of the five groups, the Top 12 that would be performing for the live shows were chosen. Joao Constancia was the very first to be called gaining the highest audience votes, followed by Niel Murillo who came in third. The rest was called based on the judge's choices.

During the live shows, the Top 12 battled it out by performing in groups, while a contestant gets eliminated every week. During the First week Ford Valencia and Joao Constancia were part of the same group wherein they came out on top being the first Best Group of the live shows. During the 4th week Niel Murillo, Ford Valencia and Russell Reyes were grouped together. They performed All-4-One's "I Swear", and received a standing ovation from the judges. Judge Vice Ganda stated that all three of them deserve a spot in the final Boyband due to how well they performed. On the final week of the competition, only 7 contestants remained. They performed as a group but were judged as individuals. At the end of the first episode with the combined Judges and Fan Votes Niel Murillo was named the first member of the Band garnering a score of 98.63%. For the second night of performance, votes reverted to zero and the remaining contestants performed individually. At the end of the competition Russell Reyes, Ford Valencia, Tristan Ramirez and Joao Constancia joined Niel Murillo forming BoybandPH. They performed their winning single titled "We Made It" in front of the audience and judges singing about making it despite the hurdles they had in their journey.

Right after winning, the boys attended different guestings wherein they were able to relay their experiences during and after the competition and their plans for the future such as their debut album, singles, gigs and tours.

2017: BoybandPH
Immediately after the win, BoybandPH released their winning song "We Made It" followed by the official single "Unli" in 2016 and "Somebody" a cover of Depeche Mode in 2017. All three songs are included in their self-titled debut album BoybandPH released on February 4, 2017. They were also featured on Jona Viray's single "Til the End of Time".

Discography

Studio albums

Singles

As lead artist

As featured artist

Filmography

Television

Awards and nominations

Notes

References

External links
 
 Star Music

Star Magic personalities
Star Music artists
ABS-CBN personalities
Filipino boy bands
Boy bands
Musical groups established in 2016
Vocal quintets
2016 establishments in the Philippines